Dr Elspeth King is a Scottish curator, writer and social historian. She is known for her role as curator of social history at the People's Palace Museum in Glasgow, as Director the Stirling Smith Art Gallery and Museum, and for her scholarship on the Scottish Suffrage movement.

Education and Career 
King was born into a mining family in Lochore, Fife.  She studied Medieval History at University of St Andrews, graduating with First Class Honours. She went on to complete a post-graduate course in Museum Studies at University of Leicester.

In 1974, King joined the People's Palace, in Glasgow as a curator, where she remained for the next 16 years. During her tenure exhibitions such as Scotland Sober and Free, the 150th anniversary of the Temperance Movement, and Michael Donnelly's 1981 exhibition of stained glass, gained record attendances. The People's Palace won European Museum of the Year in 1981 and the British Museum of the Year award in 1983.

Her pet cat Smudge became very well known in Glasgow during her time working there.

In 1990, King was passed over for the civic post of keeper of social history. This decision was considered controversial by many, and was the subject of an appeal under the council's grievance process.

King left Glasgow to take on the role of director of the Dunfermline Heritage Trust, where she helped to oversee the restoration as a heritage centre of Abbot House, the oldest secular building in the town.

In 1994, King joined the Smith Art Gallery Museum in Stirling as its first Director, where she remained until her retirement in August 2018. The museum had been threatened with closure earlier in the year due to funding cuts. However, a petition was mounted to combat this decision and gained over 7000 signatures after which the museum received a reprieve.

Honours 
King was made an Honorary Doctor of the University of Stirling in 2005 for her "outstanding work in developing Scottish museums and in promoting Scottish history and culture".

Written Works 
 The Scottish Women's Suffrage Movement / ... compiled by Elspeth King to accompany the Government sponsored 'Right to Vote' exhibition organised to commemorate the 50th anniversary of the Representation of the People Act, from 9 September- 7 October 1978. Peoples Palace Museum, Glasgow Green (1978)
 Scotland Sober and Free: the Temperance Movement, 1829-1979. Glasgow Museums and Art Galleries (1979)
 Papers of the Glasgow and West of Scotland Association for Women's Suffrage : an introduction. Peoples Palace Museum, Glasgow Green (1980)
 Barapatter. Friends of the Peoples's Palace (1983)
 Peter Fyfe, Photographer, in Hearn, Sheila G. (ed.), Cencrastus No. 14, Autumn 1983, pp. 10 – 15, 
 Images of Glasgow, a review of Noise and Smokey Breath edited by Hamish Whyte, in Hearn, Sheila G. (ed.), Cencrastus No. 14, Autumn 1983, 
 Provand's Lordship : the oldest house in Glasgow. City of Glasgow District Council (1984)
 St Nicholas' Hospital in Glasgow. Glasgow Museums and Art Galleries (1984)
 The strike of the Glasgow weavers 1787. Glasgow Museums and Art Galleries (1987)
 The People's Palace and Glasgow Green. Richard Drew Publishing (1991)
 People's Pictures: the story of tiles in Glasgow (1991)
 The hidden history of Glasgow's women : the Thenew factor. Mainstream Publishing (1993)
 Introducing William Wallace. Firtree (1997)
 The Wallace Muse: Poems and Artworks Inspired by the Life and Legend of William Wallace.(with Lesley Duncan). Luath Press (2005)
 Old Stirling. Stenlake (2009)
 A History of Stirling in 100 Objects The History Press (2011)

References

External links 
 Abbot House - The Reawakening of Dunfermline's Oldest Building
 Stirling Smith Art Gallery and Museum
 People's Palace Museum, Glasgow

Living people
20th-century Scottish historians
21st-century Scottish historians
Year of birth missing (living people)
Women's historians
Scottish women activists
Scottish feminists
Scottish curators
Scottish women curators